Winter is the 19th studio album by British folk rock band Steeleye Span. It is the second album made by a line-up consisting of Maddy Prior, Peter Knight, Rick Kemp, Liam Genockey and Ken Nicol. This is their first Christmas album.  Most of the songs on the album are traditional folk songs, but it also includes three new pieces expressing neo-pagan views on the Winter season.  It also includes a negro spiritual, "Blow Your Trumpet Gabriel", the first time the band had drawn from that particular musical genre.

Personnel
Steeleye Span
Maddy Prior - vocals
Peter Knight - backing vocals, violin, viola, electric piano
Rick Kemp - bass guitar
Liam Genockey - drums
Ken Nicol - guitar, vocals

Track listing
"The First Nowell" - 4:23
"Down in Yon Forest" - 3:44
"Unconquered Sun" (Ken Nicol) - 5:22
"Chanticleer" (William Austin) - 4:17
"Bright Morning Star" - 3:15
"Winter" (Peter Knight) - 4:13
"See, Amid the Winter's Snow" (words - Edward Caswall, music - Sir John Goss) - 5:47
"Mistletoe Bough" (Ken Nicol) - 5:35
"Sing We the Virgin Mary" - 3:41
"Today in Bethlehem" - 3:40
"Blow Your Trumpet Gabriel" - 2:54
"Hark! The Herald Angels Sing" (words - Charles Wesley) - 4:29
"Good King Wenceslas" (words - John Mason Neale) - 3:36
"In the Bleak Midwinter" (words - Christina Rossetti, music - Gustav Holst) - 4:06

References

Steeleye Span albums
2004 Christmas albums
Christmas albums by English artists
Folk rock Christmas albums